James Fredrick Lloyd (September 27, 1922 – February 2, 2012) was an American military officer, businessman, and politician who served three terms as a California Democratic politician and United States Representative from 1975 to 1981.

Career
Born in Helena, Montana, Lloyd attended public schools in Washington, California, and Oregon. He attended the University of Oregon, 1940-1942 but did not graduate. He served in the United States Navy as a naval aviator, 1942-1963 (retired). He attained his B.A. at Stanford University in 1958, and his M.A. at University of Southern California in 1966. He pursued a public relations and advertising career, then later became a teacher and instructor of political science at Mt. San Antonio College in Walnut, California, 1970-1973.

Lloyd was a member of the California Democratic State Central Committee from 1968 until 1972. He served as City Councilman of West Covina, California 1968–1975, including a term as Mayor of West Covina from 1973 to 1974. In 1974, he was narrowly elected as a Democrat to the Ninety-fourth Congress, representing a Republican-leaning district. He was reelected to the Ninety-fifth and Ninety-sixth Congresses, serving January 3, 1975 – January 3, 1981. He ran unsuccessfully for reelection in 1980, being unseated in the process by David Dreier. Lloyd was a resident of West Covina, California.

Death
Lloyd died in an auto accident after suffering a stroke while driving in Pensacola, Florida. He was 89.

References

Sources

1922 births
2012 deaths
American people of Welsh descent
California city council members
Mayors of places in California
People from West Covina, California
Democratic Party members of the United States House of Representatives from California
Politicians from Helena, Montana
Road incident deaths in Florida
Stanford University alumni
United States Naval Aviators
University of Southern California alumni
20th-century American politicians
Burials at Arlington National Cemetery
United States Navy personnel of World War II
Military personnel from California